Hakim Yahiaoui is a Paralympian athlete from Algeria competing mainly in category F13 discus throw events.

Yahiaoui has competed in three Paralympics.  He competed in the shot put and discus events in 1996, 2000 and 2004 winning a silver medal in the discus in 2004 in Athens, Greece.

References

External links
 

Paralympic athletes of Algeria
Athletes (track and field) at the 1996 Summer Paralympics
Athletes (track and field) at the 2000 Summer Paralympics
Athletes (track and field) at the 2004 Summer Paralympics
Paralympic silver medalists for Algeria
Living people
Medalists at the 2004 Summer Paralympics
Year of birth missing (living people)
Paralympic medalists in athletics (track and field)
21st-century Algerian people
Algerian discus throwers
Visually impaired discus throwers
Paralympic discus throwers